Cycloponympha julia is a moth in the  family Lyonetiidae. It is known from South Africa.

References

Endemic moths of South Africa
Lyonetiidae
Moths of Africa